Robert Edward Jones (1900–1970) was a rugby union international who represented Wales in 1926.

Early life
Bobby Jones was born on 15 October 1900 in Shanghai, China and educated at Bedford School.  He played for Wales in three matches in 1926.  He died in February 1970.

References

1900 births
1970 deaths
Welsh rugby union players
Wales international rugby union players
People educated at Bedford School